Sir John Gardiner Sumner Hobson, OBE, TD, PC, QC (18 April 1912 – 4 December 1967) was a British Conservative Party politician.

Life and career
Hobson was born in Melton Mowbray, the son of an officer in the 12th Royal Lancers. Hobson was educated at Harrow and Brasenose College, Oxford, graduating with a second-class degree in History in 1934. Hobson was called to the bar by the Inner Temple in 1938. He became a Queen's Counsel in 1957, and was Recorder of Northampton from 1958 to 1962. During World War II he served with the Northamptonshire Yeomanry, reaching the rank of lieutenant colonel. For his military service, he was appointed OBE and mentioned in dispatches.

He was first elected to the House of Commons at a 1957 by-election in the Warwick and Leamington constituency, caused by the resignation due to ill-health of the Conservative MP and former Prime Minister, Anthony Eden. He held the seat at the next three general elections. In 1959 Hobson represented suspected serial-killer Dr John Bodkin Adams in his failed attempt to be reinstated as a doctor.

He was appointed Solicitor General in 1962, receiving the customary knighthood, and serving in that post for five months before taking over as Attorney General until the Conservatives lost the 1964 general election. In 1962 he led the prosecution of the spy John Vassall. He was appointed to the Privy Council in 1963.

He approved the "sordid deal" whereby Anthony Blunt was given immunity from prosecution

Death
He died in London on 4 December 1967, from a previously undiagnosed brain tumour.

References

External links 
 

1912 births
1967 deaths
20th-century British lawyers
20th-century English lawyers
Alumni of Brasenose College, Oxford
Attorneys General for England and Wales
British Army personnel of World War II
Conservative Party (UK) MPs for English constituencies
Deaths from brain cancer in England
Neurological disease deaths in England
English King's Counsel
Knights Bachelor
Members of the Inner Temple
Members of the Privy Council of the United Kingdom
Ministers in the Macmillan and Douglas-Home governments, 1957–1964
Northamptonshire Yeomanry officers
Officers of the Order of the British Empire
People educated at Harrow School
People from Melton Mowbray
Politicians awarded knighthoods
20th-century King's Counsel
Solicitors General for England and Wales
UK MPs 1955–1959
UK MPs 1959–1964
UK MPs 1964–1966
UK MPs 1966–1970